Sean King may refer to:

 Sean King (footballer) (born 1964), former Australian rules footballer
 Sean King (water polo) (born 1989), British water polo player

See also 
 Shawn King (born 1972), American football player
 Shawn King (basketball) (born 1982), Saint Vincent and the Grenadines basketball player
 Shaun King (disambiguation)